Maria Labo is a 2015 Philippine thriller film directed by Roi Vinzon. It is based on a Philippine urban legend about an Overseas Filipino worker believed to be an aswang known as "Maria Labo" who is said to have eaten her own children.

Synopsis
The film revolves on Maria (Kate Brios) a loving and dutiful life wife to her husband, Ermin, a police officer (Jestoni Alarcon) with whom she has two children named Pablo (Miggs Cuaderno) and Rosalinda (Lenlen Frial). Facing financial problems (including Maria losing her job, and Ermin not being able to support the family on a policeman’s salary alone), Maria was convinced to become an Overseas Filipino Worker after she learned that her high school friend Emily (Sam Pinto) applied to become an overseas worker. Ermin was hesitant with his wife's plans initially but eventually gave his consent. Maria then went to Dubai in the United Arab Emirates to work as a domestic worker and caregiver.

In Dubai, Maria befriends Nanay Leng, a fellow Filipino who is also working in the emirate. In one instance in the streets after buying groceries for her employer, she was raped on a van and was later found wandering. Maria was brought to a hospital by people who found her loitering around and at the hospital she was recommended to be brought back to the Philippines. While hospitalized, her employer passes a curse to Maria. The curse, by opening his mouth and letting a black chick inside hop out from his stomach and into Maria’s, would eventually turn her into an aswang. In the process of transferring his power, Maria’s employer lost his immortality, and passed away shortly after.

In the Philippines, she was transferred to her province's provincial hospital in Capiz, where the medical personnel found something wrong with her. They conclude that she has amnesia and took note of her aggressive behavior. Ermin came to bring her back to their home, but a hospital employee discouraged him due to their findings and said that his spouse might not even recognize him. Ermin eventually convinced the hospital to take her back to their home saying that it might bring her memories back.

Back at the family residence, Maria seems back to normal until she threatens her children with a knife for running around their house. Ermin became aware of the incident with Maria claiming that the action was not within her control. Alone, her aswang curse begins to take control over her and one day she kills her children and cooks them. When Ermin discovers what she has done he repeatedly shoots her but she escapes with the Ermin calling her a “monster.”

Ermin then buries the remains of her children. Shortly, he witnessed a remorseful Maria crying nearby whose aswang curse then takes over once again. Maria receives a wound on her face after her husband hacked her face with a bolo knife and escapes once again.

Then rumors of an aswang causing terror throughout the town spread. Ermin tried to consult an albularyo who said that there is nothing that can be done to return Maria back to normal. The police then pursues the aswang that is said to have been causing problems to the town. After some encounters, Maria was killed. The film ends with an embalmer who is working on Maria's body. The embalmer then finds out that Maria's supposed corpse was nowhere to be found, only to find her to be still alive.

Cast
 Kate Brios as Maria / Maria Labo
 Jestoni Alarcon as Ermin
 Sam Pinto as Emily
 Dennis Padilla
 Mon Confiado
 Baron Geisler
 Rey "PJ" Abellana
 Rez Cortez
 Miggs Cuaderno as Pablo
 Lenlen Frial as Rosalinda

Production
Roi Vinzon decided to come up with a film based on an urban legend of an Overseas Filipino Worker who is believed to have become an aswang who have killed and ate her own children. Vinzon heard of the story while he was in Bacolod and became interested in making an adaptation of the tale into a film. To avoid legal problems, the real name of the woman was not used in the film.

The tale is particularly well known in the Visayas and Mindanao regions. Labo is said to be from the Visayas region with various accounts saying that she came from either Iloilo, Capiz, or Sorsogon. It was rumored that Labo came to Davao in particular in the 1980s or 1990s. "Labo" is an Ilonggo word for "to hack", according to the legend, Maria Labo was given a cut on her face by her husband after the former cooked and ate their children.

The film project later received funding from a group of investors from Starbuilders Production. The film is the first project of Starbuilders Production and also the first for Vinzon since 1998 when he directed Boy Indian. The film also had a comfortable but reasonable budget with Vinzon refusing to brand Maria Labo as an indie film.

The film was primarily shot in Angeles, Pampanga with some scenes shot in Dubai in the United Arab Emirates. Director Vinzon, a resident of Angeles, decided to shoot the film in the city because he found the place compatible to his ideas he has in mind for the film. Shooting in Dubai took a week to be completed.

Vinzon also said that the film did not rely much on special effects since he wanted the film to feel "natural" as possible.

Release
Maria Labo was released in cinemas on November 11, 2015. The film was distributed by VIVA Films.

References

2015 horror thriller films
Philippine horror thriller films
Philippine monster movies
Films shot in Pampanga
Films shot in Dubai
Thriller films based on actual events